The Center on Global Energy Policy is a research center located within the School of International and Public Affairs at Columbia University. The center's director is Jason Bordoff, and it features senior research scholars such as Richard Nephew and Varun Sivaram, as well as visiting fellows and adjunct senior research scholars such as Cheryl LaFleur and Richard Kauffman. The center's stated mission is to "advance smart, actionable and evidence-based energy and climate solutions through research, education and dialogue".

History

On April 24, 2013 the Center for Global Energy Policy was founded within Columbia's School of International and Public Affairs. The launch event filled Columbia's historic Low Memorial Library, where mayor Michael Bloomberg spoke about how “New York is where the energy future is taking place”. The center's director, Jason Bordoff, a professor of professional practice and a former special assistant to President Barack Obama, said that he hoped that the center would "break new ground in energy research".

Publications
The Center’s research agenda emphasizes an economic and geostrategic approach to key energy policy areas. Current research programs encompass a wide variety of specific studies and topics, focused both on U.S. policy and specific regions around the world.

Current members of the advisory board
The center has a large international advisory board.  Members include:
Nick Beim, Partner at Venrock
Thomas E. Donilon, Distinguished Fellow at Council on Foreign Relations and former National Security Advisor
Reid Hoffman, Co-Founder and Executive Chairman, LinkedIn, Partner, Greylock Partners
Dr. Paul Joskow, President of the Alfred P. Sloan Foundation
Lady Barbara Judge, Chair of the Energy Institute at University College, London
John Knight, Executive Vice President at Statoil
General (Ret.) Stanley A. McChrystal, Co-Founder and Partner at McChrystal Group LLC and former commander, International Security Assistance Force
Dr. Edward L. Morse, Managing Director, Global Head of Commodities at Citi
Joel Moser, Founding Chief Executive Officer, AQM Capital LLC and former Partner and Head, Energy & Infrastructure Group at Kaye Scholer
Daniel Poneman, former Deputy Secretary at the U.S. Department of Energy
Steven Rattner, Chairman at Willett Advisors LLC and former lead adviser to the Presidential Task Force on the Auto Industry
Theodore Roosevelt IV, Managing Director, Investment Banking at Barclays
Zachary Schreiber, Chairman and Chief Investment Officer, PointState Capital
Mona Sutphen, Partner at Macro Advisory Partners LLP and former White House Deputy Chief of Staff for Policy
Susan Tierney, Managing Principal at Analysis Group and former Assistant Secretary of Energy for Policy at the U.S. Department of Energy
Michael D. Tusiani, Chairman at Poten & Partners
Bill White, Chairman at Lazard Houston and former Mayor of Houston, Texas
Dr. Daniel Yergin, Vice Chairman at IHS and author of The Prize and The Quest
Cathy Zoi, Consulting Professor at Stanford University and former Assistant Secretary for Energy Efficiency and Renewable Energy at the U.S. Department of Energy

References

Columbia University research institutes
2013 establishments in New York City